The Ministry of Finance (Portuguese: Ministério das Finanças, MINFIN) is a cabinet-level ministry of the government of Angola. It traces it origin to 1976, and was created as a replacement for the Portuguese colonial-period Direcção dos Serviços de Fazenda e Contabilidade. The current Minister of Finance is Vera Daves.

Mission

The mission of the Ministry of Finance is to "promote the use of public resources efficiently and effectively in the interest of sustained development, within the national interest and regional integration, in a framework of macroeconomic stability; promote and stimulate economic activity in competitive market conditions; promote equitable distribution of national income redistribution through the implementation of fiscal policies and income and remedial pricing."

List of Ministers of Finance

Source:

References

Finance
Ministries established in 1976
1976 establishments in Angola